The 1902–03 MIT Engineers men's ice hockey season was the 5th season of play for the program.

Season
The season began on a sour note when team member and ice hockey club president Frank Falvey died due to acute peritonitis. A game against Phillips Andover was cancelled as a result but the team did eventually return to the ice against Harvard. After the game against the Crimson, MIT cancelled the remainder of their season in honor of Falvey.

The team did not have a head coach but P. S. Crowell served as team manager.

Note: Massachusetts Institute of Technology athletics were referred to as 'Engineers' or 'Techmen' during the first two decades of the 20th century. By 1920 all sports programs had adopted the Engineer moniker.

Roster

Standings

Schedule and Results

|-
!colspan=12 style=";" | Regular Season

References

MIT Engineers men's ice hockey seasons
MIT
MIT
MIT
MIT